Mousoulita is a village in the Famagusta District of Cyprus, located 5 km east of Angastina on the main Nicosia-Famagusta highway. It is under the de facto control of Northern Cyprus.

References

Communities in Famagusta District
Populated places in Gazimağusa District
Greek Cypriot villages depopulated during the 1974 Turkish invasion of Cyprus